Arthur Devère (24 June 1883 – 23 September 1961) was a Belgian film actor. He appeared in more than 50 films between 1913 and 1956.

Selected filmography

 L'agent Rigolo et son chien policier (1913)
 Flup chasseur (1920)
 L'héritier (1921) - Meunier
 Arthur fait du film (1921)
 The Marriage of Mademoiselle Beulemans (1932) - Isidore
 Take Care of Amelie (1932) - Van Putzeboum
 Jeunes filles en liberté (1933)
 L'ange gardien (1934) - L'aveugle
 Carnival in Flanders (1935) - Le poissonnier / The Fishmonger
 Martha (1936) - Le fermier Plunkett
 The Terrible Lovers (1936) - Le portier de l'hôtel
 Les loups entre eux (1936) - Le garçon du Vaterland
 A Legionnaire (1936) - Vandercleef
 The Man of the Hour (1937) - L'opérateur
 L'île des veuves (1937)
 The Men Without Names (1937) - Schumbe, l'ordonnance
 Miarka (1937)
 Mollenard (1938) - Joseph
 Grisou (1938) - Carbouille
 Barnabé (1938)
 The Little Thing (1938) - Barbette
 Café de Paris (1938) - Le monsieur de Rouen
 La Piste du sud (1938) - Gingembre
 Ernest the Rebel (1938) - L'amiral
 La goualeuse (1938) - Pastoureau
 Fort Dolorès (1939) - Le général
 The End of the Day (1939) - Le régisseur
 L'entraîneuse (1939) - Raymond, le domestique
 Le Jour se lève (1939) - Mr. Gerbois
 Le club des fadas (1939)
 Girls in Distress (1939) - Le père d'Alice
 Bach en correctionnelle (1940) - L'huissier
 L'empreinte du Dieu (1940)
 Fromont jeune et Risler aîné (1941) - Gardinois
 Who Killed Santa Claus? (1941) - Tairraz, l'horloger (uncredited)
 Ici l'on pêche (1941) - Pierre
 Caprices (1942) - Le régisseur
 The Strangers in the House (1942) - Le docteur (uncredited)
 It Happened at the Inn (1943) - Goupi-Mes-Sous
 Documents secrets (1945)
 The Last Metro (1945)
 Bifur 3 (1945) - Napoléon
 Le destin s'amuse (1946) - Le gardien
 La dame d'onze heures (1948) - L'éclusier
 The Mystery of the Yellow Room (1949) - Père Jacques
 The Farm of Seven Sins (1949) - Frémont
 The Perfume of the Lady in Black (1949) - Père Jacques
 Rome Express (1950) - Jeff Lambick
 Au p'tit zouave (1950) - Le père Aubin
 Véronique (1950) - Le cocher
 Juliette, or Key of Dreams (1951) - Le marchand de souvenirs
 Paris Still Sings (1951) - Le commissaire (uncredited)
 Le Plaisir (1952) - Le contrôleur du train (segment "La Maison Tellier")
 The House on the Dune (1952) - César
 The Smugglers' Banquet (1952) - Gus
 My Wife, My Cow and Me (1952)
 Follow That Man (1953) - M. Forgeat
 Their Last Night (1953) - Le marinier
 The Unfrocked One (1954) - Le défroqué alcoolique
 Death on the Run (1954) - Le détective
 Le circuit de minuit (1956) - Godelet

References

External links

1883 births
1961 deaths
Belgian male film actors
Belgian male silent film actors
20th-century Belgian male actors
Male actors from Brussels